DC Super Hero Girls: Legends of Atlantis is a 2018 American animated superhero film based on the DC Super Hero Girls franchise, produced by Warner Bros. Animation and distributed by Warner Bros. Home Entertainment. It is the fifth and final film in the DC Super Hero Girls franchise before it got rebooted by Lauren Faust, and it takes place in the Season 4 timeframe. It premiered at the San Diego Comic-Con International on July 22, 2018 and was released digitally and DVD on October 2, 2018.

Premise
An uneventful day at school until the powerful Book of Legends is suddenly stolen from Super Hero High. In order to uncover the mystery, Wonder Woman, Batgirl, Supergirl, Bumblebee and the rest of the Super Crew must journey through the depths of the ocean to Atlantis. There, the girls encounter Mera and Siren, the ocean-dwelling thieves, who prove to be a formidable match. In order to recover the stolen tome and return it to its rightful place, DC Super Hero Girls must band together and use their collective powers to successfully get back to land.

Cast

Yvette Nicole Brown as Principal Waller
Greg Cipes as Beast Boy
Teala Dunn as Bumblebee
Anais Fairweather as Supergirl
Nika Futterman as Hawkgirl
Grey Griffin as Wonder Woman
Julianne Grossman as Hippolyta
Tania Gunadi as Lady Shiva
Josh Keaton as Flash
Tom Kenny as Commissioner Gordon / Crazy Quilt
Misty Lee as Big Barda
Erica Lindbeck as Mera / Siren
Danica McKellar as Frost
Max Mittelman as Aquaman
Khary Payton as Cyborg
Stephanie Sheh as Katana
Tara Strong as Harley Quinn / Poison Ivy / Raven
Fred Tatasciore as Burly Man
Hynden Walch as Princess Koriand'r/Starfire
Mae Whitman as Batgirl

Release
The film was released on DVD and Digitally on October 2, 2018.

References

External links

 

2010s American animated films
2010s direct-to-video animated superhero films
2010s animated superhero films
2010s high school films
2018 direct-to-video films
2018 animated films
American children's animated adventure films
American children's animated comedy films
American children's animated fantasy films
American children's animated superhero films
American fantasy adventure films
Animated teen superhero comedy films
DC Super Hero Girls films
Direct-to-video animated films based on DC Comics
2010s superhero comedy films
Warner Bros. Animation animated films
Warner Bros. direct-to-video animated films
American high school films
Films directed by Cecilia Aranovich
Films set in Atlantis
Aquaman films
2010s English-language films